Pura pinta (Only for Show) is a Venezuelan teen drama telenovela created by Daniel Ferrer Cubillán (who also acts) for Radio Caracas Televisión and distributed by RCTV International.

Plot 
The story begins when a group of young university students who come from different parts of the country, know each other in the most unusual and unexpected, because for a comical confusion, everyone will arrive in Caracas to a two-room apartment that will serve as a student residence.

Cast 
 Óscar Cabrera as Darío Marcano
 Abril Schreiber as Bella Scarton McGil
 Daniela Navarro as Bianca Rondón
 Sthuard Rodríguez as Rodrigo Arenas
 Emily Guánchez as Graciela Leal
 Rigel Pesquera as Omar Lozada
 Carolina Muizzi as Ana Verónica Ruiz
 Daniel Ferrer Cubillán as Mauricio Sangronis
 Zhandra De Abreu as Dubravska Golis
 Esperanza Magaz as Janitor
 Alejandro Mata as Carlos Herrera
 Vestalia Mejías as Anahís Barboza de Conde
 Juan Carlos Baena as Felipe Scarton
 Yajaira Orta as Marina Zubillaga
 Rosalinda Serfaty as Basilia Dávila
 Andreína Pérez as Yuricandela
 Pedro Pablo Alcántara as Franklin Batista

References 

2007 telenovelas
2007 Venezuelan television series debuts
2007 Venezuelan television series endings
RCTV telenovelas
Spanish-language telenovelas
Venezuelan telenovelas
Television shows set in Caracas